Karasu, Kara-su, Kara su, Qarasu or Gharasu (lit. 'black water/river' in Turkic languages) may refer to:

Rivers

The Balkans
 A former name of the Struma River (Struma Karasu) in Bulgaria and Thrace, northern Greece
 A former name of the Mesta River (Mesta Karasu) in Bulgaria and northern Greece, forming the border between Greek Macedonia and Thrace
 A former name of the Haliacmon (İnce Karasu) in western Macedonia, northern Greece
 Karasu (Istanbul), a river in the greater Istanbul area of Turkey

Central Asia
 Qarasu River, a small river in northeast Iran feeding into the southeast corner of the Caspian Sea
 Kara-Suu (Aksy), a right tributary of the river Naryn in Aksy District, Kyrgyzstan
 Kara-Suu (Kara-Köl), a left tributary of the river Naryn near Kara-Köl, Kyrgyzstan
 Karasu, name of the last stretch of river Shiderti, Kazakhstan
 Karasu (Koybagar), a river in the Kostanay Region, Kazakhstan
 Karasu (Urkash), a river in the Kostanay Region, Kazakhstan

Japan
 Karasu River (Gunma) in Gunma Prefecture, Japan

Turkey
 Karasu (Euphrates), the western of the two major sources of the Euphrates in Eastern Anatolia
 Karasu (Hatay), a tributary of the Orontes River (formerly of Lake Amik) in Hatay Province, southeastern Turkey, bordering Syria
 A small river in northwest Anatolia, a tributary of the Sakarya River

Town and villages

Azerbaijan
Qarasu, Hajigabul
Qarasu, Kurdamir
Qarasu, Qabala
Karasu Kumlakh or Qarasuqumlaq, Agdash Rayon

China
Karasu, Xinjiang, a place at the foot of the Kulma Pass

Crimea
Karasubazar

Kazakhstan
 Karasu District, Kostanay Region
 Karasu (village), administrative center of Karasu District

Kyrgyzstan
several places, see Kara-Suu (disambiguation)

Tajikistan
Karasu, Tajikistan, Vahdat District

Turkey
 Karasu, Sakarya, a town in Sakarya Province
 Karasu, Karacabey, a village in Bursa Province
 Karasu, Yenice, a village in Çanakkale Province
 Karasu, Refahiye, a village in Erzincan Province
 Karasu, Aşkale, a mahalle in Erzurum Province
 Karasu, Karayazı, a mahalle in Erzurum Province

Uzbekistan
Karasu or Qorasuv, Andijan Province, adjacent to Kara-Suu, Kyrgyzstan

Fictional characters
 Karasu, a character from the manga and anime series Yu Yu Hakusho
 Karasu, a Noein character
 Karasu, a ninja puppet in Naruto

Other uses
 Karasu, an album in the 13 Japanese Birds series by Merzbow
 Karasu Bay, a fictional bay in the air combat video game The Sky Crawlers: Innocent Aces
 Karasu relief, a rock relief in Turkey, near where the Karasu River, the western branch of the Euphrates, joins the eastern branch of the Euphrates
 Karasu, a species of giant beaked whale

People with the surname
 Carasso family, a Sephardic Jewish family of Salonika, often spelled Karasu
 Emmanuel Carasso (1862–1934), lawyer and politician
 Isaac Carasso (1874–1939), Emanuel's nephew, founder of Groupe Danone.
 Daniel Carasso, Isaac's son, co-founder of Dannon in the U.S.
 Albert Karasu, Jewish-Turkish journalist

Turkish-language surnames